In the People's Republic of China, schools can be fully subsidized by the government. These are public schools. Schools can also be partly subsidized by the government. That means that parents have to pay tuition fees and other fees required by the school. Other schools are fully private schools, meaning that the schools are not subsidized by the government. The introduction of private schools was an attempt by the government to increase the number of literate population. Private schools can claim the same legal status as public schools. Private schools are thought to require a high standard of service.

References

 
 
Educational organizations based in China